Hipposaurus ('horse lizard') is an extinct genus of basal therapsids known from the Tapinocephalus Assemblage Zone of the Main Karoo Basin, South Africa. Chronologically this is within the Capitanian stage of the Guadalupian Series (Middle Permian). The genus was first described by S.H. Haughton as H. boonstrai on the basis of a skull and associated skeleton and was later considered a gorgonopsian in the family 'Ictidorhinidae' by Robert Broom. It is now considered a basal biarmosuchian, but its affinities remain uncertain. H.boonstrai is currently known from only two specimens in the Iziko South African Museum, Cape Town.

"H.brinki" is based on a single skull that was described by D. Sigogneau in 1970; however, the poor condition of the holotype means most considerations of biarmosuchians ignore it.

See also

 List of therapsids

References

General
 The main groups of non-mammalian synapsids at Mikko's Phylogeny Archive

Biarmosuchians
Prehistoric therapsid genera
Guadalupian synapsids of Africa
Fossil taxa described in 1929
Taxa named by Sidney H. Haughton
Capitanian genus first appearances
Capitanian genus extinctions